Anders Thomsen (born 1 January 1994) is an international speedway rider from Denmark and twice Danish champion.

Speedway career 
Thomsen became champion of Denmark, winning the Danish Championship in 2020. He rode in the second tier of British Speedway from 2013–2016, riding for Glasgow Tigers and Peterborough Panthers. In 2020, he won a bronze medal at the 2020 Speedway of Nations and in 2021, he won the Danish title for the second time and was awarded a permanent wildcard for the 2021 Speedway Grand Prix.

In 2022, ten days after a serious injury in a Danish speedway meeting, Thomsen claimed his first Grand Prix victory in Gorzow, Poland, beating Martin Vaculík, Bartosz Zmarzlik, and Patryk Dudek in the final. He eventually finished in 14th place during the 2022 Speedway World Championship, after securing 51 points, which included winning the Gorzów Grand Prix but another injury (a broken leg in the GP Challenge curtailed his season and he was unable to compete in the final four Grand Prix events. Despite the latest injury Thomsen was selected as a permanent rider for the 2023 Speedway Grand Prix. Also in 2022, he helped SES win the 2022 Danish Super League.

Major results

World individual Championship
2020 Speedway Grand Prix - 18th 
2021 Speedway Grand Prix - 11th
2022 Speedway Grand Prix - 14th (including Gorzów grand prix win)

World team Championships
2020 Speedway of Nations - 3rd

References 

Living people
1994 births
Danish speedway riders
Glasgow Tigers riders
Peterborough Panthers riders
Sportspeople from Odense